Zohar Sharon is a blind Israeli golfer who won titles in Israel as well as Europe.

Biography
Zohar Sharon lost his sight in a chemical accident while serving in the Israel Defense Forces. Following the accident, Sharon began art therapy.  He went on to study painting at the prestigious Avni Institute of Art in Tel Aviv and produced work of impressive quality. He was also a member of the national goalball team and participated in the Summer Paralympics.

In 2003, he won the World Invitational blind golf tournament in Scotland. His first real domestic success came in a doubles tournament in which he won with a top Ethiopian golfer, Israel's only Ethiopian golfer, Asher Iyasu.

References

Israeli male golfers
Israeli blind people
Israeli Jews
Jewish golfers
1952 births
Paralympic goalball players of Israel
Living people
Parasports competitors
Sportspeople with a vision impairment